Graduation Day 1966 is a live album by The Beach Boys, released on December 9, 2016. It was originally recorded in 1966.

Background
For the past few years, thanks to copyright laws, The Beach Boys have released a few digital-only releases featuring rarities, unreleased material, and other recordings that have not otherwise been officially released, all of which are fifty years old in that particular year. 
This show was part of the band's promotion tour of the album Pet Sounds in 1966, during that time Brian Wilson was working in the then upcoming/unreleased album Smile.

Track listing

Personnel
 Carl Wilson – vocals, lead guitar
 Dennis Wilson – vocals, drums
 Mike Love – vocals, electro-Theremin on "Good Vibrations"
 Al Jardine – vocals, rhythm guitar
 Bruce Johnston – organ, vocals
 Brian Wilson - vocals, bass guitar

References

2016 live albums
The Beach Boys live albums
ITunes-exclusive releases
Capitol Records live albums
Albums produced by Mark Linett
Albums produced by Brian Wilson